New Inheritors is the fourth album by Canadian indie rock band Wintersleep, released on May 17, 2010, in Europe, and in North America on May 18.

The band began working on the album in September 2009. The mixing process finished in January 2010, and the masters were done by February.

Several songs that are featured on the album were played live throughout 2009 and 2010, including "Encyclopedia", "Baltic", "Black Camera", "Experience the Jewel", and "Blood Collection".

The song "Black Camera" was made available for streaming, while the title track, "New Inheritors", was released as a free download in March 2010. On May 3, 2010, all the tracks for New Inheritors began being streamed on the Wintersleep website.

Title is taken from a short story by Nathanial Hawthorne called "The New Adam & Eve".

Track listing

Credits
Anne–Marie Proulx – Handclapping
Caraline Risi – Strings
Graeme Patterson – Artwork
Greg Calbi – Mastering
Jace Lasek – Assistant
Jon Samuel – Group Member, Keyboard
Liam Lynch – Strings
Loel Campbell – Group Member, Drums, Percussion
Michael Bigelow – Group Member, Bass Guitar
Mick Cooke – Brass, String Arrangements
Paul Murphy – Group Member, Lead Vocals, Guitar
Rachel Denkers – Handclapping
Robin Rankin – Keyboards
Rosie Townhill – Strings
Sébastien Rivard – Assistant
Tim D'Eon – Group Member, Guitar (occasionally keyboard)
Tony Doogan – Engineer, Mixing, Producer
Ysla Robertson – Strings

References

2010 albums
Wintersleep albums
Albums produced by Tony Doogan